Infitah ("openness") or Law 43 of 1974 was Egyptian President Anwar Sadat's policy of "opening the door" to private investment in Egypt in the years following the 1973 October War (Yom Kippur War) with Israel.  Infitah was accompanied by a break with longtime ally and aid-giver the USSR – which was replaced by the United States – and by a peace process with Israel symbolized by Sadat's dramatic flight to Jerusalem in 1977. Infitah ended the domination of Egypt's economy by the public sector and encouraged both domestic and foreign investment in the private sector.   The Egyptian Army's crossing across the Suez canal in the October 1973 Yom Kippur War, which, despite Egypt's eventual defeat, was seen by many as a political victory for its initial successes and gave Sadat the prestige to initiate a major reversal of Gamal Abdel Nasser's policies.

Overview

Under President Nasser, proponents of statism and a command economy with limited private investment, dominated the political scene. However, by the 1970s, critics believed Egypt's economy, with its large public sector, had evolved into a "Soviet-style system" of "inefficiency, suffocating bureaucracy, and waste." Sadat also wanted to turn Egypt away from its focus on war with Israel and devotion of resources to a large military establishment. He believed capitalist economic policies would build a substantial private sector, and alliance with the United States and the West would lead to prosperity (rakhaa ) and eventually democratic pluralism. Infitah was not only ideologically but also politically motivated: by aligning himself with the capitalist West, and the rich and powerful members of Egyptian society, Sadat differentiated himself from his predecessor Nasser while at the same time securing his position in power.

Shortcomings

The implementation of Infitah is generally considered to have been flawed in its over-ambitiousness and its appearance of having abandoned "solidarity with the poor." The government rewarded its cronies and allies (many of whom became quite rich), and built a power base loyal to the regime with concessions on land, goods and commodities; mandates and contracts to agencies and dealerships, but did little to create free markets and an open economy. The millions of previously poor Egyptians who had joined the middle class under the Nasser regime through education and jobs as doctors, engineers, teachers, lawyers, journalists for the government or parastatals, were left stuck in an "increasingly marginalized, stagnant and low-paying public sector," under Infitah. Infitah was a shock to the Nasser-era middle class, reversing the socialist principles of Nasserism, seeming to revoke policies of free education, social equality, abolition of feudalism, nationalization of land and industry, and progressive taxation. At the same time the public sector continued to dominate the economy. The proportion of the population working for the state grew from 3.8% at the height of the Nasserite era, to 10% (about 35% of the country's entire labor force) after the full thrust of Infitah in the early 1980s. Despite promotion of foreign private investment, the "state's contribution to the formation of investment capital" (72%), barely changed from the mid-1960s to the end of the 1970s.

According to author Tarek Osman "Infitah's main fault was that it was over ambitious. It failed to recognize the complexities of Egypt's socio-economic conditions ... It ignored the limitations of the country's administrative system and the power of the military establishment ... the mismatch between the skills of the Egyptian middle class and the various economic opportunities springing up as a result.  ... As such, it was an unrealistically rapid developmental program that was doomed to fail." 

In 1977, negative public reaction to Infitah policies led to massive spontaneous riots involving hundreds of thousands of Egyptians when the state announced that it was retiring subsidies on basic foodstuffs. On 6 October 1981, Sadat was assassinated during a military parade in Cairo.

See also
Anwar Sadat
Arab socialism
Gamal Abdel Nasser
History of modern Egypt
Liberalization
Nasserism
Privatization
Yom Kippur War

Notes

External links
 The Politics of Economic Strategy: Egypt

Anwar Sadat
Economic history of Egypt
1970s in Egypt
Middle East peace efforts